Shangqing may refer to:

Shangqing (deity), a Taoist god
Shangqing School, Daoist movement
Shangqing Bridge, overpass in Beijing
Shangqing, Jiangxi (上清), a town in Guixi, Jiangxi, China
Shangqing Township, Anxi County (尚卿乡), a township in Anxi County, Fujian, China
Shangqing Township, Taining County (上青乡), a township in Taining County, Fujian, China